The Backcountry Super Cubs Mackey SQ2 is an American STOL amateur-built aircraft, designed and produced by Backcountry Super Cubs of Douglas, Wyoming. The aircraft is based upon the design of the Piper PA-18 Super Cub and is supplied as a kit for amateur construction.

Design and development

The aircraft fuselage is made from welded steel tubing, with the wings constructed of aluminum sheet, all covered in doped aircraft fabric. The aircraft can be fitted with tundra tires for operations on soft or rough surfaces. Construction time from the supplied kit is 1200 hours.

Operational history
By December 2011 seven examples had been reported as completed and flown.

Specifications (Mackey SQ2)

References

External links

Homebuilt aircraft
Single-engined tractor aircraft
Backcountry Super Cubs aircraft